Hynds is a surname. Notable people with the surname include:

Ross Hynds (1947–2015), New Zealand Paralympic athlete
Tommy Hynds (1880–?), Scottish footballer

See also
Hynds Lodge in Cheyenne, Wyoming, named for businessman Harry P. Hynds

English-language surnames